Pyrausta metasialis is a moth in the family Crambidae. It was described by George Hampson in 1912. It is found in Sikkim, India.

References

Moths described in 1912
metasialis
Moths of Asia